Bellet is a French surname. Notable people with this name include:

 Corinne Rey-Bellet
 François Bellet
 Jean-Pierre Bellet
 Maurizio Bellet
 Pierre-Paul Pecquet du Bellet

Other 
 Bellet, a type of Provence wine

See also 
 Bellett
 Belet

French-language surnames